John Olubi Sodipo (October 15, 1935 – December 4, 1999), was a Nigerian philosopher.

Early life and education 
He went to Remo Secondary School, Sagamu from 1948 to 1953 and also to University of Ibadan from 1956 to 1960 and at the Durham University, England from 1961 to 1964.Lectured University Ibadan from 1964 to 1966 Sodipo lectured in philosophy at the University of Lagos from 1966 and taught at Obafemi Awolowo University from 1968 to 1982, where he became the first professor in African philosophy and served as first head of department of philosophy. He became the first vice-chancellor of Ogun State University when it opened in 1982. Sodipo was an editor of Second Order: An African Journal of Philosophy.

References

1935 births
1999 deaths
People from Ogun State
Nigerian philosophers
Alumni of Durham University
Academic staff of the University of Lagos
Academic staff of Obafemi Awolowo University
Academic staff of Olabisi Onabanjo University
Vice-Chancellors of Nigerian universities
20th-century Nigerian philosophers